St Joseph's Convent School, Sagar (SJC) is a private coeducational Roman Catholic school in the Cantonment area of Sagar, Madhya Pradesh, India. It is affiliated to the Central Board of Secondary Education, New Delhi.

History 
The school was founded on 6 January 1906 by the Indian Province of the Sisters of St. Joseph of Chambéry. It is administered by the Sisters of St. Joseph's Convent, Jabalpur in accordance to the general rules governing the above congregation. Saint Joseph is the patron Saint of the school.

Campus 
The school campus is divided into two main sections: the Shishu Bhavan (pre-school) and the high school (primary, middle and high school). The school has 40,468 square metre, or 9.9 acre campus located in the heart of Sagar's cantonment.
It is well connected to the city's residential and business areas through arterial and main roads.

Academics 
The school is a leading educational institution in the city and in the state of Madhya Pradesh, delivering holistic English education to students in the region. The institution imparts education up to 10 + 2 levels and is affiliated to the Central Board of Secondary Education, New Delhi. Faculty members belong to different regions of India.

Facilities 
St. Joseph's Convent School offers its students a modern computer laboratory, auditorium, library, audio visual room, science labs and sprawling playgrounds covering 12000 square metres.

Principal 

The current principal of the school is Sr. Molly Thomas Monicatt.

References

External links 
 http://sjcsagar.net/

Catholic secondary schools in India
Primary schools in India
High schools and secondary schools in Madhya Pradesh
Christian schools in Madhya Pradesh
Education in Sagar, Madhya Pradesh